"Teaser" is a single by American R&B singer George Benson, which entered the UK Singles Chart on 14 February 1987. It reached a peak position of number 45, and remained on the chart for 4 weeks.

Personnel
 George Benson - lead guitar & lead vocals
 Walter Afanasieff - keyboards
 David Jenkins - rhythm guitar, background vocals
 Cory Lerios - keyboards & bass sequencing
 Sterling - synth horns
 Narada Michael Walden - arrangements, drums
 Bud Cockrell, Jennifer Hall, Carolyn Hedrich - background vocals

References 

George Benson songs
1987 singles
Warner Records singles
1987 songs
Songs written by Jeffrey E. Cohen
Songs written by Narada Michael Walden
Songs written by David Jenkins (musician)
Songs written by Cory Lerios